Crowley is an unincorporated community in Malheur County, Oregon, United States. Crowley Ranch and Crowley Ranch Airstrip are nearby.

Crowley Creek was named for Green Berry Crowley who settled on its banks with his son James in 1874. The Crowleys' home was burned in 1878 during the Bannock War but the family escaped. Crowley post office was established in 1911 and ran until 1935. There was previously a Crowley post office in Polk County.

References

Unincorporated communities in Malheur County, Oregon
1911 establishments in Oregon
Unincorporated communities in Oregon